APICA or Apica  may refer to:

Toponyms 
 Apica River, stream in Charlevoix Regional County Municipality, Capitale-Nationale, Quebec, Canada
 Mont-Apica, Quebec, unorganized territory in Lac-Saint-Jean-Est Regional County Municipality, Saguenay–Lac-Saint-Jean, Quebec, Canada
 RCAF Station Mont Apica, a radar station Mont-Apica, Quebec

Chemistry 
 APICA (drug) (1-amino-5-phosphonoindan-1-carboxylic acid)
 APICA (synthetic cannabinoid drug) (N-(1-adamantyl)-1-pentyl-1H-indole-3-carboxamide))